Mikata District may refer to:
 Mikata District, Fukui, Japan
 Mikata District, Hyōgo, Japan